Platycephalichthys is a genus of tristichopterid lobe-finned fish which lived during the middle Devonian, upper Givetian stage.

Phylogeny
Below is a cladogram from Swartz, 2012:

See also

References

Prehistoric lobe-finned fish genera
Eotetrapodiforms
Devonian bony fish